Patrick Fuchs is an American public official who has served as a member of the Surface Transportation Board (STB) since January 17, 2019. He is a member of the Republican Party.

Education 
Fuchs received his undergraduate education at the University of Wisconsin–Madison, where he later received a master's degree in public policy analysis and management. During his education, Fuchs took part in an international economic program hosted by the National University of Singapore.

Career 
In 2011, Fuchs was chosen to be a Presidential Management Fellow at the White House Office of Information and Regulatory Affairs. Prior to joining the STB, Fuchs was a staffer on the Senate Commerce Committee, where he worked on the 2015 Surface Transportation Board Reauthorization Act.

Surface Transportation Board 
In March 2018, Fuchs was nominated by President Donald Trump to serve as a member of the Surface Transportation Board (STB). He was confirmed by the United States Senate and took office on January 17, 2019. Fuchs' term in office is set to expire in January 2024.

References

University of Wisconsin–Madison alumni
Surface Transportation Board personnel
Biden administration personnel
Trump administration personnel
Date of birth missing (living people)
Year of birth missing (living people)
Living people